Edward Oliver (born December 12, 1997) is an American football defensive tackle for the Buffalo Bills of the National Football League (NFL). He played college football at Houston, and was drafted by the Bills in the first round of the 2019 NFL Draft.

Early years
Oliver attended Westfield High School in Houston. Oliver had 83 tackles, nine sacks and an interception as a senior and 84 tackles and seven sacks as a junior. In Oliver's senior season, Westfield went 11–1 into the 2015 UIL playoffs, where they lost 28–21 in the Area final to later state runner-up Austin Lake Travis.

Oliver was rated as a consensus five-star recruit and was ranked among the top players in his class. Receiving offers from a multitude of powerhouse schools, including Alabama, Florida, LSU, Oklahoma, Texas, and Texas A&M, Oliver chose to play college football at the University of Houston, becoming the first recruit rated by ESPN as a five-star to commit to a school outside the Power Five conferences.

College career

Oliver became an immediate starter his true freshman year at Houston in 2016. He started all 12 games during the regular season, recording 60 tackles and five sacks. He was named the winner of the Bill Willis Trophy, becoming the first freshman to win the award.

In 2017, Oliver's sophomore season, he was selected to the Walter Camp All-America first team and won the Outland Trophy, presented to the nation's top interior lineman.

Following his junior year in 2018, Oliver decided to forgo his senior year and enter the 2019 NFL Draft.

College statistics

Professional career

On March 5, 2018, before the start of his junior year, Oliver announced that he already intended to forgo his final year of eligibility and enter the 2019 NFL Draft. In May 2018, ESPN draft analyst Todd McShay projected Oliver to go No. 1 overall in the 2019 draft.

Oliver was drafted by the Buffalo Bills in the first round with the ninth overall selection in the 2019 NFL Draft. On May 9, 2019, Oliver signed his four-year rookie contract, worth a fully guaranteed $19.7 million.

2019
In week 7 against the Miami Dolphins, Oliver recorded his first career sack on Ryan Fitzpatrick in the 31–21 win. In week 13 against the Dallas Cowboys on Thanksgiving Day, Oliver recorded two sacks on quarterback Dak Prescott, including a strip sack recovered by teammate Trent Murphy that set up a Bills touchdown in the 26–15 win. Oliver was named the Pepsi NFL Rookie of the Week for his performance in Dallas. He finished his rookie season with 5 sacks and 43 combined tackles.

2020
In Week 2 against the Miami Dolphins, Oliver recorded another season opening sack on Ryan Fitzpatrick during the 31–28 win. He finished the season with 33 tackles, three sacks and a forced fumble through 16 starts.

2021
Oliver entered the 2021 season as a starting defensive tackle. He started all 17 games, recording 41 tackles, four sacks and a forced fumble.

2022
On April 26, 2022, the Bills picked up the fifth-year option on Oliver's contract. In Week 12, Oliver had six tackles, two for a loss, a safety, a forced fumble and recovery in a 28-25 win over the Lions, earning AFC Defensive Player of the Week.

NFL career statistics

Regular season

Postseason

Personal life
A native of Houston, Texas, Oliver is an avid horseback rider.

On May 16, 2020, Oliver was arrested in Houston on charges of driving while intoxicated and unlawfully carrying a weapon and held in Montgomery County Jail before posting bail the next day. The charges were dismissed in July due to lack of evidence. Later reflecting on the arrest, Oliver stated that he felt "violated" and recorded a 0.00% on his breathalyzer test.

References

External links

  Sports Reference (college)

Houston Cougars bio
Buffalo Bills bio

1997 births
Living people
All-American college football players
American football defensive tackles
Buffalo Bills players
Houston Cougars football players
Players of American football from Houston